Oldpark Football Club is an Irish former football club from north Belfast. It was founded in 1880 by members of the Oldpark Cricket Club. It was subsequently a founding member of the Irish Football Association in 1880 and the Irish Football League in 1890, but retained membership of the latter only for two seasons. The club reached the final of the County Antrim Shield in 1890-91 but lost. The club folded after the 1891–92 season.

Honours

Senior honours
Belfast Charity Cup: 1
1884–85

References

Association football clubs established in 1880
Association football clubs disestablished in 1892
Defunct association football clubs in Northern Ireland
Defunct Irish Football League clubs
Association football clubs in Belfast
1880 establishments in Ireland
1892 disestablishments in Ireland
Former senior Irish Football League clubs
Founding members of the Irish Football Association